Mohammad Zahid Ashraf (born in a village named Jalkaura, district-Khagaria, Bihar in  1973) is an Indian biotechnologist and a professor at Jamia Millia Islamia. Known for his studies on thrombosis experienced at high altitudes. Ashraf is an elected fellow of the National Academy of Sciences, India and Indian Academy of Sciences,  and an elected member of the National Academy of Medical Sciences. The Department of Biotechnology of the Government of India awarded him the National Bioscience Award for Career Development, one of the highest Indian science awards, for his contributions to biosciences, in 2017–18.

Biography 

Mohammad Zahid Ashraf, born in 1973, graduated in biosciences from Jamia Millia Islamia in 1994 and continued there to secure a master's degree in 1996. Subsequently, he did his doctoral research at Vallabhbhai Patel Chest Institute which earned him a PhD from the University of Delhi in 2001. His post-doctoral training was at the Lerner Research Institute of Cleveland Clinic and on his return to India, he joined the Defence Institute of Physiology and Allied Sciences (DIPAS) in 2009 as a scientist at grade D at its Genomics division which he headed from 2014 till 2017. He moved to his alma mater, Jamia Millia Islamia that year  where he holds the position of a professor at the department of biotechnology.

Ashraf leads a team of researchers who are involved in studies in the fields of Cardiovascular biology, Functional genomics, Molecular medicine and Translational biology. He worked among the Indian army soldiers stationed in Siachen Glacier to study the effect of high altitude on venous thrombosis and his studies were published in the Proceedings of the National Academy of Sciences of the United States of America. It was during these studies, he discovered the role played by novel regulator “Calpain” in pathogenesis of thrombosis. He has published a number of articles; ResearchGate, an online repository of scientific articles has listed 34 of them.

Ashraf resides in Delhi, along the Mall Road.

Awards and honors 
Ashraf was elected as a member of the National Academy of Medical Sciences in 2015. and the National Academy of Sciences, India and the Indian Academy of Sciences elected him as a fellow in 2018. The Department of Biotechnology of the Government of India awarded him the National Bioscience Award for Career Development, one of the highest Indian science awards, for him contributions to biosciences, in 2017–18. He is also an invited member of the Pulmonary Vascular Research Institute and a recipient of Innovations Award (2008) of the Cleveland Clinic Foundation, P.A. Kurup Oration Award (2014) of the Indian Society for Atherosclerosis Research and the Rear Admiral M. S. Malhotra Award (2014) of the Defence Research and Development Organisation.

Selected bibliography

See also 

 Translational research
 Hypoxia

Notes

References 

N-BIOS Prize recipients
Indian scientific authors
Living people
1973 births
Indian medical researchers
Indian biotechnologists
Fellows of The National Academy of Sciences, India
Scientists from Delhi
Jamia Millia Islamia alumni
Academic staff of Jamia Millia Islamia
Delhi University alumni
Cleveland Clinic people
People from Khagaria district
Scientists from Bihar
Scholars from Bihar